The Blue Quran (Arabic: الْمُصْحَف الْأَزْرَق‎, romanized: al-Muṣḥaf al-′Azraq) is an early Quranic manuscript written in Kufic script. The dating, location of origin, and patron of the Blue Quran are unknown and have been the subject of academic debate, though it is generally accepted that the manuscript was produced in the late 9th to mid 10th-century in either Kairouan, Tunisia or Cordoba in Umayyad Spain. The manuscript is among the most famous works of Islamic calligraphy, notable for its gold lettering on a rare indigo-colored parchment. Art historian Yasser Tabbaa wrote that the "evanescent effect" of the gold lettering on the blue parchment "appears to affirm the Mu'tazili belief in the created and mysterious nature of the Word of God."

Form
The Blue Quran was written in Kufic script, characterized by sharp angles and the absence of vowel markings. Each page contains 15 lines, which is untraditional for the period. It was common for Qurans to have thick margins, few lines, and large spaces between words, much like the Amajur Quran, which contained three lines per horizontal page. More common features of the Blue Quran include the perceptible column of letters on the right side of each folio and the splitting of unconnected letters between lines in the manuscript.

The manuscript is thought to have contained 600 parchment folios made from sheepskin, which was commonly used because of the thinness of the finished product. Due to the size and construction of the manuscript, the parchment would have required at least 150 sheep. The signature blue color of the parchment came from an indigo dye that was derived from an indigotin-bearing plant material, either Indian Indigo or woad. Due to the similar composition of all indigo dyes, modern analytic technology and art historians are unable to make a definitive conclusion on the source of the blue dye. However, research done by scholar Cheryl Porter, whose work focuses on the use and technical implementation of color in manuscripts, has determined that the dye was likely brushed onto the parchment before it was stretched and dried.

The gilded lettering in the manuscript was given its gold sheen by the application of gold leaf over an adhesive, such as gum, egg white, fig sap, fish collage, or a glue byproduct of parchment making. The text was outlined in black or brown ink, which can be attributed to an iron-tannate ink that was common for the manuscript's estimated time and place of creation. Each sura was demarcated into groups of twenty verses using rosettes made from either silver leaf or silver ink. The verse markers were also detailed with red paint, which were thought to have come from either lac or safflower. Curiously, several pages of the manuscript have been completely or partly stripped of the golden letters. These erasures seem to go beyond correcting scribal mistakes as encountered regularly elsewhere.

History

Controversy of origin 
The exact origin of the Blue Quran is unknown. Scholars have proposed that the manuscript was created under the Abbasid, Fatimid, or Umayyad Caliphate, or the Aghlabid or Kalbid dynasty. This would place the location of origin in Iran, Iraq, Tunisia, Spain, or Sicily.

One theory is that the Blue Quran was produced in Persia during the Abbasid Caliphate. This was first proposed by Frederik R. Martin, a Swedish diplomat and dealer, who introduced the Blue Quran to the academic community. He claimed that he obtained some of the manuscript's pages in Constantinople and that it originated in Mashhad, Persia, where they were commissioned for the tomb of the 9th-century Abbasid caliph Harun al-Rashid. This is supported by the Persian customs stamp on one of its pages. Additionally, the horizontal layout of the Blue Quran resembles the Qurans created in the early Abbasid Period, which would place the manuscript in or around modern day Iraq. These pieces of evidence support the idea that the Blue Quran was created in the Eastern Islamic world.

On the other hand, the Blue Quran was included in the inventory of the Great Mosque of Kairouan, which places the manuscript in Tunisia around 1300 CE. While this does not confirm that the manuscript was created in Tunisia, scholars argue that transporting the Blue Quran in its entirety over a long distance would be unlikely. This supports the idea that the Blue Quran was created in the Western Islamic world.

Additionally, the Blue Quran shares many characteristics, including its deep blue color, with the Bible of Cava, a manuscript created in 812 CE in Umayyad Spain. The physical similarities between the two supports the idea that the Blue Quran originated in Spain around the 9th-century. One theory is that an Umayyad patron commissioned the Blue Quran and that the manuscript was created by Christians, who have a greater tradition of writing their sacred texts on dyed parchment than Muslims. Since the distance between Spain and Tunisia is closer than that of Persia and Tunisia, transporting the Blue Quran would be easier and therefore more likely.

Presently, there is still controversy among scholars as to where the Blue Quran originated. Many museums cannot agree on how to categorize the manuscript, with some, like the Denver Art Museum, categorizing it as Asian Art while acknowledging it may have origins in North Africa. This conflicting categorization reflects how scholars do not, and may never, agree on the true origins of the Blue Quran.

Current status of the manuscript 
The manuscript's approximately 600 folios were separated and dispersed during the Ottoman Empire, though most of the folios remained in Kairouan, Tunisia until the 1950s. It is estimated that about 100 folios remain in museums and private collections, with the largest being the 67 folios held by the Musée de la Civilisation et des Arts Islamiques near Kairouan. Other collections include the National Library, the Museum of Fine Arts, the Harvard University Art Museums, and the Metropolitan Museum of Art. Several of the detached folios have also been sold at major British auction houses Christie's and Sotheby's in the 2010s, carrying a price of hundreds of thousands of dollars apiece. Most recently, Christie's auctioned off one folio in 2018 for a reported £512,750, over double the low estimate for the lot. Two folios are included in the Khalili Collection of Islamic Art. The Raqqada NAtional Museum of Islamic Art in Kairouan has two folios, and so does the Museum of Islamic Art, Doha in Qatar.

References

External links 
 Page from the Blue Quran, Museum of Islamic Art, Doha via Google Arts & Culture
 Historical Images: The Blue Qur'an from the Fatimid Period, "A Very Spiritual Piece"

Quranic manuscripts
10th-century manuscripts
Collections of the Bardo National Museum (Tunis)
Works of calligraphy